The 1971–72 Regionalliga  was the ninth season of the Regionalliga, the second tier of the German football league system. The league operated in five regional divisions, Berlin, North, South, Southwest and West. The five league champions and all five runners-up, at the end of the season, entered a promotion play-off to determine the two clubs to move up to the Bundesliga for the next season. The two promotion spots went to the Regionalliga West and Regionalliga Süd champions Wuppertaler SV and Kickers Offenbach.

Regionalliga Nord
The 1971–72 season saw two new clubs in the league, OSV Hannover and Polizei SV Bremen, both promoted from the Amateurliga, while no club had been relegated from the Bundesliga to the league.

Regionalliga Berlin
The 1971–72 season saw two new clubs in the league, Berliner SV 1892 and Meteor 06 Berlin, both promoted from the Amateurliga Berlin, while no club had been relegated from the Bundesliga to the league.

Regionalliga West
The 1971–72 season saw four new clubs in the league, Bayer Uerdingen, VfL Klafeld and Arminia Gütersloh, both promoted from the Verbandsliga, while Rot-Weiß Essen had been relegated from the Bundesliga to the league.

Regionalliga Südwest
The 1971–72 season saw two new clubs in the league, Phönix Bellheim and SpVgg Andernach, both promoted from the Amateurliga, while no club had been relegated from the Bundesliga to the league.

Regionalliga Süd
The 1971–72 season saw four new clubs in the league, SV Darmstadt 98, SpVgg Bayreuth and SpVgg Ludwigsburg, all three promoted from the Amateurliga, while Kickers Offenbach had been relegated from the Bundesliga to the league.

Bundesliga promotion round

Group 1

Group 2

References

Sources
 30 Jahre Bundesliga  30th anniversary special, publisher: kicker Sportmagazin, published: 1993
 kicker-Almanach 1990  Yearbook of German football, publisher: kicker Sportmagazin, published: 1989, 
 DSFS Liga-Chronik seit 1945  publisher: DSFS, published: 2005

External links
Regionalliga on the official DFB website 
kicker 
Das Deutsche Fussball Archiv  Historic German league tables

1971-72
2
Ger